The Luis Maria Baca Grant No. 4, south of Crestone, Colorado, was a large land grant made in 1860 by the United States to the heirs of the original Vegas Grandes Grant at Las Vegas, New Mexico. Title to the grant at Las Vegas was clouded by a second grant of the same land. The Baca heirs were offered alternative lands from the public lands of the United States. The Bacas deeded the land to their attorney, but it soon passed by tax sale to a third party. The ranch headquarters was on Crestone Creek to the southwest of Crestone. The Baca Grant was one of the first large tracts of land to be fenced in the West and in its heyday was the home of prize Hereford cattle.

In addition to ranching there was some mining in the area to the east and south of Crestone, some on the lands of the grant, but no big strikes. In 1880 the town of Crestone was platted by George Adams, the owner of the Baca Grant. In 1900, with the help of Eastern investors, George Adams ignited a minor boom, reopening one of the more promising mines and building a railroad spur to the town and the mines along the Sangre de Cristo Range south of town. However, lacking good ore, the boom was short-lived. A long period of decline followed.

By 1948 Crestone had declined to its post-war population of 40 souls, mostly retired folks and cowboys who worked on The Grant, as the Baca Grant was called locally. In 1950 the last private owner of the Grant, Alfred Collins, died. In 1951 the property was sold to the Newhall Land and Farming Company which held it until 1962 when, retaining the mineral rights, Newhall sold it to Arizona-Colorado Land and Cattle Company. In 1971 a portion of the Baca Grant, under the corporate ownership of the Arizona-Colorado Land and Cattle Company, immediately south of Crestone, was subdivided, creating the Baca Grande, a subdivision originally platted for about 10,000 lots. At great expense, underground utilities were installed and roads built. However, sales lagged and by 1979 the development was considered a liability by the corporation, then renamed AZL. Maurice Strong, owner of a controlling interest in AZL and his fiancée Hanne Marstrand visited the development and "fell in love with it." The Strongs were inspired to create a world spiritual center and began granting parcels of land to traditional spiritual organizations.

In the late eighties, the remaining lands and waters of the ranch, now termed the "Baca Ranch" or "Baca", were used as a base by the corporate ownership of the ranch, reorganized as "American Water Development, Inc" (AWDI), to make an application in the Colorado Water Courts to develop and export deep underground water to the front range cities of Colorado. This application was vigorously opposed by the local community in the San Luis Valley and met defeat in the Colorado Supreme Court in 1991.

In 1995, with the Baca under new ownership, a new group of investors initiated another water exportation plan. The Stockman's Water plan, as it was known, was the creation of San Luis Valley native Gary Boyce and his Cabeza de Baca company. The Stockman's Water plan was defeated in the Colorado legislature in 1998.

Bankrupt, the lands of the corporation, after sustained litigation, were purchased by the Nature Conservancy and subsequently incorporated into the public lands of the United States, the southern and eastern portions as national forest and the Great Sand Dunes National Park and Preserve and the northern and western portions as the Baca National Wildlife Refuge. The original ranch headquarters and other buildings are on the wildlife refuge. As is usual on federal wildlife refuges, grazing and hay production continue on a limited basis.

History of the original Las Vegas Grant
The following is copied from a US Forest Service document:

Action under the Treaty of Guadalupe Hidalgo:

Notes

San Luis Valley of Colorado
Geography of Saguache County, Colorado
Great Sand Dunes National Park and Preserve